Rarden can refer to:

 Rarden, Ohio
 The RARDEN cannon